Celebrity Bowling was an American television series of the 1970s, featuring bowling matches played by well-known actors, singers and others.

Episodes (in order of appearance)

John Beradino and Greg Morris vs. Frank Gorshin and Christina Gorshin
Kathy Lennon and Janet Lennon vs. Peggy Lennon and Dianne Lennon
Gail Fisher and Ed Asner vs. Peggy Lennon and John Davidson
John Davidson and Gail Fisher vs. Dianne Lennon and Richard Long
 Sammy Shore and Johnny Tillotson vs. Richard Long and Ed Asner
Gloria Loring and Trini Lopez vs. Lee Meriwether and David Canary
Sue Ane Langdon and Trini Lopez vs. Lee Meriwether and Max Baer
David Canary and Sue Ane Langdon vs. Gloria Loring and Max Baer
Mimi Hines and Phil Ford vs. Arte Johnson and Gary Owens

References

Bowling television series